Byron Sound is a large fjord-like bay on the coast of West Falkland in the Falkland Islands, facing northwards. There is one main settlement on the bay: Hill Cove, and it contains numerous islands, including Saunders Island. It appears to be the glacially enlarged estuary of the Blackburn River.

References

Straits of the Falkland Islands
Bays of West Falkland
Sounds (geography)